The 2011 Mexican League season was the 87th season in the history of the Mexican League. It was contested by 14 teams, evenly divided in North and South zones. The season started on 18 March with the match between 2010 season champions Saraperos de Saltillo and Acereros de Monclova and ended on 26 August with the last game of the Serie del Rey, where Tigres de Quintana Roo defeated Diablos Rojos del México to win the championship.

For this season, the number of teams was reduced from 16 to 14 after Dorados de Chihuahua and Tecolotes de Nuevo Laredo folded due to financial problems.

Standings

Postseason

League leaders

Awards

References

Mexican League season
Mexican League season
Mexican League seasons